Toni James Dunlop (born 3 November 1969) is a New Zealand rower and a 3 times olympian.

Dunlop was born in 1969 in Invercargill, New Zealand. He represented New Zealand at the 1992 Summer Olympics in the coxed four, where the team was completed by Bill Coventry, Guy Melville, Ian Wright, and Carl Sheehan (cox). Of the twelve teams, they came eleventh. He represented New Zealand at the 1996 Summer Olympics where he came fifth in the coxless pair with Dave Schaper. He represented New Zealand at the 2000 Summer Olympics in the coxless four. The team, which included Scott Brownlee, Dave Schaper, and Rob Hellstrom, came sixth. He is listed as New Zealand Olympian athlete number 610 by the New Zealand Olympic Committee.

References

1969 births
Living people
New Zealand male rowers
Rowers at the 1992 Summer Olympics
Rowers at the 1996 Summer Olympics
Rowers at the 2000 Summer Olympics
Olympic rowers of New Zealand
Sportspeople from Invercargill